Jono Dorr (born April 9, 1990) also known as Jonathan Dorr, is an American singer, songwriter, multi-instrumentalist and record producer. He has written and produced music for various artists including Hayley Kiyoko, The Neighbourhood, Kehlani, G-Eazy, French Montana, Gnash, Bibi Bourelly, Skizzy Mars, Devon Baldwin, Janine, Phem, and Marco Mckinnis. He has released several singles as a solo artist, and his debut EP, The Unexamined Life Part 1, was released on August 12, 2020.

Early life
Jono Dorr was born and raised in Los Angeles, California. He grew up playing guitar and explored many genres of music including classic rock, blues, and funk. Throughout his childhood, he played guitar and bass in various bands.  While attending the Academy of Music and Performing Arts at Alexander Hamilton High School, Dorr participated in an electronic music class in which he learned how to create and produce music digitally. He then started producing and songwriting with various singers and rappers. Graduating from UC Santa Cruz with a major in Philosophy and a minor in Electronic Music, Dorr originally planned on becoming a lawyer to satisfy the wishes of his parents but instead opted for a career in music.

Career
Motivated by his parents' ultimatum to either be successful in music or get a non-entertainment related job, Dorr started out by composing and recording cues for reality television shows. This allowed him to support himself while also fine-tuning his production and songwriting skills. In 2018, Dorr co-produced and co-wrote Hayley Kiyoko's breakout album, Expectations, which reached the Top 20 Album charts in the US, Canada, and Australia. In 2019 Dorr became a solo artist releasing four original songs that featured his production and songwriting along with his vocals.

Unexamined Life Pt. I
On August 12, 2020, Dorr released his first 6 track EP titled Unexamined Life Pt. 1. The Ep's title was inspired by the famous Socrates quote, “The unexamined life is not worth living.” Dorr told New Music Weekly that the album was about “choosing pain over ignorance, freedom over obedience, and purpose over greed.” The release was met with positive reviews, being referred to as “an eclectic piece of work that is equal parts haunting, delicate, and devastating,” by popular music blog Imperfect Fifth. The Ep was preceded by three singles. The first single, “High Tide” was released on February 20, 2020 along with a music video. The second single, “Wanna Stay,” was released on April 23, 2020. “Quiet Footsteps,” the EP's third single was released on June 25, 2020 and is described as the essence of a pop ballad while carrying the spirit of the blues and a therapeutic purging of sad thoughts by Ray Sang at UK music blog, IndustryMe. The fourth single, “Deep End,” was released after the EP on October 7, 2020 and featured inspiration from folk music with a sound compared to Bon Iver.

Influences
Dorr's modern pop/R&B sound draws upon his varying musical inspirations. He has specifically cited the raw, jarring quality of the blues along with the communal efforts of motown music as his biggest inspirations. His combination of genres has created a sound that has been described as, “cerebral and grounded, a stunning contrast of darkness and light.” Dorr has been compared to such artists as The Weeknd and Bon Iver.

Songwriting and production credits

References

1990 births
Living people
Singer-songwriters from California
Record producers from California